In tennis, the 2017 US Open Series was the fourteenth edition of the US Open Series, which comprised a group of hard court tournaments that started on July 24, 2017 in Atlanta and concluded in Connecticut for the women and in Winston-Salem for the men on August 26, 2017. This edition consisted of three separate men's tournaments and three women's tournaments, with the Western & Southern Open hosting both a men's and women's event. The series was headlined by two ATP World Tour Masters 1000 and two WTA Premier 5 events.

Discontinuation of the Bonus Challenge
The 2017 US Open Series is the first edition of the series not to feature the Bonus Challenge. In previous years, players had been eligible for additional prize money, based on a combination of their finish in the series and their finish in the US Open itself, with the maximum amount of money being awarded to a player who won both.

Tournament schedule

Week 1

ATP – BB&T Atlanta Open

Nick Kyrgios was the defending champion, but chose not to participate this year.

Main Draw Finals

Week 2

WTA – Bank of the West Classic (Stanford)

Johanna Konta was the defending champion, but chose not to participate this year.

Main Draw Finals

Week 3

ATP – Rogers Cup (Montreal)

Novak Djokovic was the defending champion but withdrew with an elbow injury before the tournament began. He also announced that he would miss the remainder of the 2017 season, and thereby the entire US Open Series, due to the injury.

Main Draw Finals

WTA – Rogers Cup (Toronto)

Simona Halep was the defending champion, but lost to Elina Svitolina in the semifinals.

Main Draw Finals

Week 4

ATP – Western & Southern Open (Cincinnati) 

Marin Čilić was the defending champion, but withdrew before the tournament began.

Main Draw Finals

WTA – Western & Southern Open (Cincinnati) 

Karolína Plíšková was the defending champion, but lost in the semifinals to Garbiñe Muguruza.

Main Draw Finals

Week 5

ATP – Winston-Salem Open 

Pablo Carreño Busta was the defending champion, but lost in the second round to Julien Benneteau.

Roberto Bautista Agut won the title, defeating Damir Džumhur in the final, 6–4, 6–4.

Main Draw Finals

WTA – Connecticut Open (New Haven)

Agnieszka Radwańska was the defending champion but lost to the eventual champion Daria Gavrilova in the semi-finals.

Main Draw Finals

Weeks 6–7

ATP – US Open (New York)

Stan Wawrinka was the defending champion but withdrew with a knee injury before the tournament began having announced he would miss the remainder of the 2017 season.

Main Draw Finals

WTA – US Open (New York)

Angelique Kerber was the defending champion, but lost in the first round to Naomi Osaka.

Main Draw Finals

References

External links